Anoeciinae is a subfamily of the family Aphididae. Anoeciines live underground and feed on the roots of plants.

Genera
These four genera belong to the subfamily Anoeciinae:
 Anoecia Koch, 1857
 Krikoanoecia Zhang & Qiao, 1996
 † Berendtaphis Heie, 1971
 † Bolshayanoecia Heie, 1989

References

Aphididae
Hemiptera subfamilies